Melaleuca pallida, commonly known as lemon bottlebrush, is a plant in the myrtle family, Myrtaceae and is endemic to eastern Australia. (Some Australian state herbaria use the name Callistemon pallidus.) It is an upright shrub with thin, spreading branches, silvery new growth and pale yellow, sometimes pinkish bottlebrush flowers.

Description
There is a distinct mid-vein, 6-16 indistinct side veins and many distinct oil glands.

The flowers are a shade of cream to yellow, occasionally pinkish-red and are arranged in spikes on the ends of branches that continue to grow after flowering and sometimes also on the sides of the branches.

Taxonomy and naming
The lemon bottlebrush was first formally described in 1816 by Aimé Bonpland, who gave it the name Metrosideros pallida and published the description in Description des plantes rares cultivées à Malmaison et à Navarre. In 1828, de Candolle changed the name to Callistemon pallidus and in 2006 Lyndley Craven changed the name to Melaleuca pallida. The specific epithet (pallida) is a Latin word meaning “pale” referring to the pale flower colour.

Callistemon pallidus is regarded as a synonym of Melaleuca pallida by the Royal Botanic Gardens, Kew.

Distribution and habitat
Melaleuca pallida occurs from the Border Ranges area in far south eastern Queensland, through the ranges and slopes of New South Wales to eastern Victoria.  It is also present in all but the far west of Tasmania and on some Bass Strait islands. It grows in streams and wet, rocky slopes.

Use in horticulture
Melaleuca pallida is sometimes cultivated as Callistemon pallidus. It is a hardy plant, adaptable to many soils but needs full sun.

Gallery

References

pallida
Flora of New South Wales
Flora of Queensland
Flora of Tasmania
Flora of Victoria (Australia)
Plants described in 1816
Taxa named by Aimé Bonpland